Air distribution may refer to:

In Heating, ventilation, and air conditioning
Forced-air systems
Room air distribution
Underfloor air distribution
More generally, ventilation includes both passive ventilation and active ventilation

Special cases include:
Ventilation (firefighting)
Ventilation (mining)

It may also refer to the distributions of gases, aerosols, or heat in air.